Latvian Swedes are Swedes of full or partial Latvian descent residing in Sweden. In 21st century people of  Latvian diaspora without Swedish citizenship reside legally in Sweden as well. In 2020, there were 9,288 Latvian-born people living in Sweden. Parts of Latvia, Swedish Livonia, was a Swedish dominion in the 17th century.

Around 6,000 Latvian nationals fled to Sweden following the World War II, a total of 3,418 officially registered in 1945.

Notable people 

 Janis Bubenko (born 1935), computer scientist
 Laila Freivalds (born 1942), politician
 Kārlis Princis (1893–1978), biologist
 Velta Rūķe-Draviņa (1917–2003), linguist and folklorist
 Lars Vilks (1946–2021), visual artist

See also 
 Swedish extradition of Baltic soldiers
 Swedish Livonia

References 

 
Ethnic groups in Sweden
Latvia–Sweden relations